Eupithecia unicolor is a moth in the family Geometridae. It is found from British Columbia south to California.

The wingspan is about 21 mm. The forewings are violaceous with two black oblique cross lines. Adults have been recorded on wing from May to November.

The larvae feed on Juniperus scopulorum, Thuja plicata and Chamaecyparis nootkatensis. The larvae are twig mimics. They are mottled yellowish green with a brown head. Full-grown larvae reach a length of about 20 mm. Larvae can be found from April to May and pupation occurs in June. The species overwinters as a mid-instar larva.

References

Moths described in 1896
unicolor
Moths of North America